Béla Spányi (19 March 1852, Pest – 12 June 1914, Budapest) was a Hungarian painter who specialized in landscapes.

He studied in Vienna, Munich and Paris and spent much of his time in Szolnok, a popular gathering place for artists. He was one of the assistants who worked with Árpád Feszty to produce his monumental cyclorama Arrival of the Hungarians.

External links

 ArtNet: More works by Spányi
 Spányi at the Kieselbach Galleries
 Biography and appreciation @ Művészet (1914)
 Coins Honor Hungarian Artist Béla Spányi @ Coin Update

1852 births
1914 deaths
19th-century Hungarian painters
20th-century Hungarian painters
Hungarian male painters
19th-century Hungarian male artists
20th-century Hungarian male artists